Jari may refer to:

Finnish male given name
The name Jari derives from the Finnish name Jalmari, which in turn derives from the Old Norse male name Hjalmar or Hjálmarr (hjalmr 'helmet' + arr 'warrior/army').

Notable people with the name Jari include:

Jari Europaeus, Finnish football (soccer) player and manager
Jari Isometsä, Finnish cross-country skier
Jari Kurri, Finnish ice hockey player
Jari Litmanen, Finnish football (soccer) player
Jari Lipponen, Finnish archer
Jari Mäenpää, Finnish heavy metal musician
Jari Niemi, Finnish football (soccer) player
Jari Puikkonen, Finnish skijumper
Jari Pyykölä, Finnish football manager
Jari Rantanen, Finnish football (soccer) player
Jari Sillanpää, Finnish singer
Jari Tervo, Finnish author
Jari-Matti Latvala Finnish rally driver

Other
Jari gan, genre of music in Bengal
Jari (dwarf), Norse dwarf
Jari, Rio Grande do Sul, city in Brazil
Jari, Iran (disambiguation)
Jari River, a northern tributary of the Amazon river on the border between the states of Pará and Amapá in Brazil
Jari River (Purus River), a tributary to the Rio Purus, which itself is a major tributary to the Amazon River
JARI, the Japan Automobile Research Institute
Zari, or jari, metallic thread used in South Asian brocade
Albert Ekka (Jari) block, a community development block in Jharkhand, India
Jari, Gumla, a village in Jharkhand India
JARI USV, Chinese unmanned surface vehicle

See also
 Jarry (disambiguation)

Finnish masculine given names